Ben-Zion Gold ( – April 18, 2016) was an American rabbi who was the Rabbi of the Hillel at Harvard University from 1958 until he became Rabbi Emeritus in 1990.  Gold was born in 1923 in Radom, Poland, and is the only member of his family to have survived the Holocaust. He immigrated to the United States in 1947. He was a graduate of the Jewish Theological Seminary.

Rabbi Gold's memoir of his childhood in pre-war Poland was widely admired.

Books
 Tradition and Contemporary Reality (sermons and speeches), Puritan Press (Cambridge, MA), 1990
 The Life of Jews in Poland before the Holocaust: A Memoir by Ben-Zion Gold, University of Nebraska Press (Lincoln, NE), 2007
 Cisza przed burzą. Życie polskich Żydów przed Holokaustem (Polish edition), wyd. Austeria, Kraków - Budapeszt, 2011

References

1920s births
2016 deaths
20th-century Polish Jews
People from Radom
Jewish Theological Seminary of America alumni
Harvard University people
Rabbis from Massachusetts
Polish memoirists
Polish emigrants to the United States
21st-century American Jews